Abdolmoghim Nasehi is an Iranian Shia cleric and conservative politician who is a former member of the City Council of Tehran and was head of its cultural commission.
He was formerly head of religious activities of the Tehran municipality.

References
 Biography

1949 births
Living people
Combatant Clergy Association politicians
Alliance of Builders of Islamic Iran politicians
Tehran Councillors 2013–2017
Tehran Councillors 2007–2013